The Grand Sierra Railroad is a 2 ft miniature steam locomotive themed Peanuts train ride located in the Camp Snoopy area of Knott's Berry Farm in Buena Park, California. The four minute train ride transport guests on a journey around reflection lake and the surround camp snoopy and Fiesta Village. The ride opened in the 1983 season as part of the opening of Camp Snoopy. The train ride was previously longer prior to the opening of Silver Bullet. When Silver Bullet opened on December 7, 2004, the track layout of the Grand Sierra Railroad was shortened in the Reflection Lake area. In 2014, the ride underwent a refurbishment in cooperation with Garner Holt Productions and opened with small animatronic and figures from the Peanuts characters as part of Camp Snoopy's 30th anniversary. Moreover, during Knott's Spooky Farm, the Grand Sierra Railroad undergoes a family friendly Halloween themed overlay with characters from the Peanuts comic strip. There is also a peanuts celebration overlay during Knott's Peanuts Celebration. Riders must be 46 inch tall to ride by themselves, or no height restriction if accompanied by an adult.

History
Prior to the extensive refurbishment of Camp Snoopy, the Grand Sierra Railroad was not themed and was rather a basic train ride with views of reflection lake. A noticeable past feature of the Grand Sierra Railroad was the folding bridge over the lake. When the train ride was shortened, the reflection lake bridge no longer folded since water was no longer found underneath the bridge. Also, the Walter Knott steamboat was taken out and removed in 2004 as part of the construction for Silver Bullet. In early 2014, Knott's Berry Farm announced a makeover of Camp Snoopy for the 30th anniversary including an overlay for the Grand Sierra Railroad. Moreover, the ride reopened in the early summer 2014 season as part of the reopening of camp snoopy. The ride now features a great night light package featuring various peanuts characters.

Ride
The Grand Sierra Railroad station is located next to the Sierra Sidewinder roller coaster. Guests board a miniature steam locomotive train. As the train passes underneath the Balloon Race ride, guests encounter various small animatronic characters from the Peanuts universe. Snoopy, Linus, Sally, Woodstock and Charlie Brown are located throughout the 4 minute ride. During the middle of the ride, guests are given a great view of reflection lake where a small boat can be spotted featuring Charlie Brown and Sally.

Photo Gallery

See also
 Ghost Town & Calico Railroad Knott's authentic larger train ride

References 

Knott's Berry Farm
Railroads of amusement parks in the United States
Miniature railroads in the United States
1983 establishments in California